USS R-21 (SS-98) was an R-class coastal and harbor defense submarine of the United States Navy.  Her keel was laid down on 19 April 1917 by the Lake Torpedo Boat Company in Bridgeport, Connecticut; the R-boats built by Lake Torpedo Boat (R-21 through R-27) are sometimes considered a separate class from those built by Fore River Shipbuilding (R-1 through R-14) and Union Iron Works (R-15 through R-20).  She was launched on 10 July 1918 sponsored by Mrs. Dallas C. Laizure and commissioned on 17 June 1919.

Service history
Attached to Submarine Division 1, R-21 operated out of the submarine base at New London, Connecticut. She conducted diving and approach tactical training in Long Island Sound, and conducted several training cruises in the vicinity of Block Island with other units of the division. Following a recruiting cruise to New Haven, Connecticut, and Bridgeport, Rhode Island, from 20 August to 27 August, she returned to New London for upkeep.

R-21 continued practice dives off the coast into the fall with a call at the Torpedo Station, Newport, Rhode Island, on 21 October. Proceeding via Hampton Roads, Wilmington, North Carolina, Savannah, Georgia, Key West, Florida, Havana, Cienfuegos, and Guantanamo Bay, Cuba; and Kingston, Jamaica, she arrived at Coco Solo, Panama Canal Zone, on 11 December.

Following several practice dives out of Coco Solo, she transited the Panama Canal on 27 January 1920 for drydock work at Balboa. Returning to Coco Solo, R-21 continued to refine her diving, approach, and torpedo tactics through the spring and summer. During two trips to Almirante Bay, 30 March-2 April and 17–20 May, she practiced with other units of the first division.

Given hull classification symbol SS-98 in July, R-21 again transited the canal to Balboa 27 September for a month in drydock. Upon returning to Coco Solo, she was laid up for 11 months of extensive overhaul. She sailed north on 26 September 1921 via Guantanamo Bay, Key West, and New York City, arriving New London on 27 October. She sailed to Portsmouth, New Hampshire, on 27 December for refitting.

A successful test dive on 26 May 1922 meant that R-21 could return to New London. Through the spring and summer months she operated out of New London and Newport.

The craft of Submarine Division 1 sailed from New London on 2 October 1922 for Coco Solo. R-21 served as flagship as the boats cruised via Hampton Roads and Guantanamo. After 11 days out, R-24 developed engine trouble and was temporarily taken under tow by R-21. The Cuba-bound steamer SS Bethore rendered assistance, and R-21 arrived at Coco Solo on 27 October.

R-21 spent the rest of her active Navy days operating out of Coco Solo and undergoing repairs at Balboa. She sailed from Coco Solo for the last time 15 February 1923 in company with a tender, and eight other submarines. Two days later R-21s engines malfunctioned and she was towed into Guantanamo by the tender. Repairs were quickly accomplished and R-21 sailed for Philadelphia, Pennsylvania, on 22 February, arriving there via Charleston, South Carolina, on 9 November 1923.

Decommissioned at the Philadelphia Navy Yard on 21 June 1924, R-21 was struck from the Naval Vessel Register on 9 May 1930 and sold for scrap 30 July 1930.

References

External links
 

Ships built in Bridgeport, Connecticut
R-21 (SS-98)
1918 ships